is an anime TV series created by Yasuhiro Imagawa (Giant Robo, G Gundam) and produced by A.C.G.T.

The TV series premiered January 10, 2002 on TV Tokyo and finished in run on June 27, 2002, totaling 25 episodes. A New Year's special episode was included in the seventh DVD volume (KIBA-745) released on October 2 of the same year. Due to production schedules, the manga adaptation, illustrated by Azusa Kunihiro, started serialization in Akita Shoten's Shōnen Champion on November 8, 2001, two months before the anime premiere. The manga ended on May 25, 2002 and collected in three volumes.

Title
The title Seven of Seven or Shichinin no Nana is a pun, as the main character's name, Nana, means 'seven' in Japanese. It relates the premise of the series, where Nana has split into seven different sides of the personality due to an accident with a crystal.  In addition, Nana Suzuki's name is a reference to namesake Nana Mizuki, who voices the character of Nana in the anime.

Plot
The plots of the anime and the manga differ.

Anime synopsis
After seeing a rainbow as a child and being mesmerized by its beauty, Nana's grandfather has been trying all his life to capture the beauty of a rainbow within a crystallized form. After years of failed attempts and crazy inventions, such as a VCR toaster and vacuum cleaning mouse catcher, he finally discovers a way to make such a crystallized rainbow. His plan would work by separating the light from a rainbow into its seven basic colors and then reforming it into seven colorized crystals. His experiment was working too and only needed a few seconds in the microwave to be complete and finally fulfill his dream. That is when Nana, who was searching for the microwave in an attempt to bake a chocolate cake for Yuichi, opened the door before the crystal had fully hardened and caused an accident.

The crystal glowed and split into the seven colors of the rainbow, hitting Nana as one color and coming out of her in seven separate colors of the rainbow, creating seven different Nanas. Aspect of Nana's personality suddenly exist its own separate physical form, there is a giggly Nana, a sleepy Nana, a crybaby Nana, a grumpy Nana, one who is a bit of a flirt, and an intellectual Nana, who all standing alongside the original Nana. However, they are all also the same Nana, and all share the same feelings for the boy Yuichi, which is clearly seen as their first thought is to finally make that chocolate cake which they try to do and are working and talking in perfect sync with each other, as if they were still just one person, that is until the cake is done at which time they start fighting over who will give it to Yuichi.

Each Nana grabs one of the crystals that formed from the one crystal her grandfather was trying to harden in the microwave and realizes it gives her super powers, she can fly, has super strength and super speed. This leads to a chase between the original Nana, and the new six sides of her personality who are all fighting as they fly and destroy parts of town over who will give the cake to Yuichi. When they finally finish, they once again prove they are all parts of the same Nana as they are all too scared to approach him and hand him the cake.

The crystals also hold another power seen later on as Nana wears a costume from an anime she (and the other Nanas) loved as a child called the "Nana Rangers". While they are wearing the costume and at the same time carrying their crystals the prop costumes turn into the real "Nana Rangers" costumes allowing them at times to be Superheroes, and also all show themselves in public at once, since Nana and the others realize the danger of all being seen at the same time without masks or some way of hiding that they are all the same person.

After they had settled on their roles, the 7 Nanas also face the fact that if the crystals are not reintegrated within a year after the split, all 7 of them will disappear. Later, the 8th one appears causing chaos.

Manga synopsis
This story has no super power elements.

Nana Suzuki's father returns from a trip abroad, and he gives Nana a crystal that he had bought from a gypsy woman.  He tells her the gypsy woman's warning, to never let the light of the moon pass through the crystal. That night Nana hangs the crystal in front of her window; there is a moon visible through the window. In the morning Nana wakes to find six other Nanas in bed with her.

Initially, Nana Suzuki goes to school and the other six Nanas stay home. The six quickly rebel against that plan. They take advantage of an opportunity to blackmail the principal of the school into letting all of them attend school, in the same class. The Nanas also quickly realize that it is confusing for all of them to be called "Nana", so they agree on nicknames for each of them.

Yuichi isn't the least bit bothered that there are now seven Nanas in his class. He doesn't show any favoritism towards any one of the Nanas over the others.

Characters
The anime set of characters. (The manga set corresponds with this to some degree)
 - Nana in her original form, and the one form that remains even when the other parts of her personality split from her. Shy and very timid, she has had a crush on a boy in her class called Yuichi for as long as she can remember, and yet has been too nervous to approach him and tell him how she feels. This has led to three girls, who eventually end up being her friends as the story progresses, to tease and torment her as they try to vie for Yuichi's attention. She is also the only Nana to simply be called "Nana". Her color is blue. 
 - The "Hot-Tempered Nana". A tomboy with a short temper, she likes to fight and work out, and has a hot-headed personality. She has narrow pupils and her color is red. 
 - The "Easygoing Nana". Laid-back, this Nana has an affinity for fish items (specifically, Billy-related items). Nanakko takes a relaxed approach to life, even with an approaching deadline, and speaks with a childish and congested voice. Due to her easygoing personality, she is often seen as slow and unintelligent by the other Nanas, with Nanapon even attempting to trick her on multiple occasions. She has lighter colored pupils, and her color is orange. 
- The "Smiling Nana". Happy-go-lucky, she always has a smile on her face, and has a positive outlook on everything. She likes movies, especially funny ones, and she is very friendly and easy to get along with. Her color is yellow. 
 - The "Crybaby Nana". She is very sensitive, up to the point that almost anything can make her cry. Her power allows her to emit sonic waves from her voice when she cries loudly, and the only way to make her stop is to calm her down by feeling the back of her head. Her color is chartreuse (called "Yellow-green" in the English dub). 
 - The "Brainy Nana". Intelligent but stubborn, this Nana likes books and manga. The title of the book she always reads is Les Misérables. In the anime, she always speaks with immaculate enunciation, and she is the only Nana who wears glasses. Her color is green. 
 - The "Ghostly Nana". Flirty and mysterious, she likes spiritual things. She has been shown to be capable of fortune telling, and she possesses weak telekinetic powers. She also has the essence of feminine physique, obtaining impressive measurements in the school physical, and being able to use her breasts to hide small objects. At one time, she used her prism to hypnotize the other Nanas into cleaning the house, and eventually accidentally hypnotizes herself while trying to teach the original Nana hypnosis. This results in her putting the entire town in a trance in an attempt to see Yuichi's high school list. Her color is purple. 
 - The dark side of Nana or the "Eighth Nana". She first appears on New Year's, planning on interfering with Nana's plans. Disturbingly, Hitomi cannot tell her apart from the others. While she, like the other Nanas, ultimately wants Nana to succeed, she is not beyond using less-than-moral methods such as sabotage to ensure Nana's success, which at one point ends up backfiring. She has proven to be more powerful than the other six combined. Jamanana can hypnotize people, even without carrying her crystal. As a Nana Ranger, Jamanana has white hair and wears a jagged red scarf, sharp ears, and inward curving horns on the helmet, and does not need a costume to transform. Her color is black.
 - Nana's closest and oldest friend, she tries to support Nana in her quest to tell Yuichi how she really feels. Her parents also own a restaurant which she and Nana go to each year and have a yearly party. She is also the one that seems to know Nana better than Nana knows herself, and can easily tell who is who after they split into seven individual parts of the same personality. Hitomi has completely different looking eyes without glasses, a feature Hitomi used to disguise herself. 
 - Nana's crush, he is into photography and is continually taking pictures around town. He is also very smart, which is part of why Nana lacks the confidence to confess to him, as she often struggles to keep up with him academically. She longs to the same high school as him, however his school of choice has very high entry requirements. Unfortunately, it is later discovered that he has feelings for another girl, even taking up photography and trying to get into her high school to impress her. Usually kind and open, he comes to see Nana as a good friend, however he is completely oblivious to all the girls around him who have a crush on him. At the end, he finds out that Nana has a crush on him. 
 - The vice-principal of Nana's school, he is often very harsh with the students, and tends to push Nana and the other students very hard. However, it is revealed that he actually has a lot of respect for his students, and ultimately pushes them because he wants them to succeed. He defends Nana when she is refused a chance to enter her chosen high school after Jamanana hurts Tsuki, noting that while Nana was looked down upon by members of the honors class, she has since worked hard to become one of its top students and would not be so foolish as to throw it all away. As a prank, the trio once referred to him as "melon-head", and when the term catches on, he is initially angered by it, but he eventually sees the humor in it, and even willingly refers to himself as such. 
 - The school guidance counselor. Similarly to Mr. Handa, he can come across as harsh at times, but also ultimately wants to help the students, and is a caring person on the inside. Hitomi develops somewhat of a crush on him after he caringly gave her his jacket when she was in the cold during Christmas (not realizing it was her since she was not wearing her glasses). 
The three girls have the worst marks in school, but want to enter the same high school and are impressed that Nana managed to move from their level to the honors class with Yuichi and Hitomi. Hayashiba, the leader of the group, is a childhood friend of Nana's and a very talented Japanese dancer, Kogarashi is a sneaky girl who brags about people, and Morinuma is the girl with fish lips who wears baggy pants all the time and turns out to be kind and empathetic. Hayashiba eventually chose a Japanese dancing school, a different choice from Kogarashi and Morinuma, as a promise to her grandfather to become a maiko dancer. After the graduation, Morinuma went to a nursing school, Kogarashi entered a special school to become a cartoon voice actress. (Hayashiba)  (Kogarashi)  (Morinuma)
Mayor - Owner of the 7 of Seven convenience store. Mayor lent the Nana Ranger costumes to Rokuzo (Nana's grandfather) when Rokuzo claims he had found 7 girls working for school festival. After the Nana Rangers had saved Mayor from a scooter gang, he gave them the costumes as gift. 
 - A childhood friend of Yuichi and a seeming rival to Nana for his affections. She is currently in her last year at the junior high division of Yasaka Oogi and studies hard in obtain a good placement for when she moves to the high school division. Yuichi and Nana have both applied for the high school division, despite how difficult it will be to enter. Her focus on her schoolwork leads her to reject Yuichi's feelings for her and, after criticizing Nana for spending time doing things other than studying, gains the dislike of the trio of girls supporting Nana. Tsukie, brilliant and focused, is the reason why Yuichi is so smart - he wants to get into the same high school as her and studies as hard as he can, like Nana is attempting to do to stay with Yuichi. She loves art, but because members of her family have traditionally become doctors, she is expected to study medicine and go to university. After becoming friends with Nana, she decides to study art instead of medicine at her high school. 
 - Nana's grandfather, who lives with Nana. He spent a lot of time on his research and did not pay much attention to Nana, which resulted in the incident that splits Nana into seven. He does care a lot about her and worries that his experiment might have dire consequences on Nana's well-being. Many of Rokuzo's experiments have ended in failure, including attempts to recombine Nana. 
 - Nana's mother who lives in San Francisco for business reasons. She loves Nana dearly and wants her daughter to be as successful as possible. She and Yuichi run into each other in San Francisco without either of them knowing how the other is connected to Nana nor does Nana ever know her mother and Yuichi have met. 
 - Nana's father. He also lives in San Francisco. He is a bit of a pushover, but also loves Nana a lot. He is more sentimental than his wife, especially when he notices that both Nana and Grandpa want to remain in their house in Kotomachi, but tends to go along with her wishes. 
 (Miss Honey) - A girl from San Francisco sent to Nana's house to help Nana improve her English, though she turns out to be a complete slacker who does not really attempt to tutor Nana. It turns out that Nana's mother sent Honey to Japan so Honey would be able to confess her feelings to a boy she knows in Japan. During her visit, she discovers the secret of the seven Nanas, but promises to keep it a secret. Nana runs into her again in San Francisco, when it turns out she is Yuichi's host during his home stay program. Melody Honey is also a minor character in the anime Sgt. Frog and in Arcade Gamer Fubuki. 
Mary Lou - During Nana's trip to San Francisco, Honey assigned Mary, a little girl whom Honey babysits regularly, to Yuichi and Nana as part of the home stay program. Mary tried to use Nana's crystal, but she could only cause earthquakes. 
Billy - A fish mascot. It is usually seen as a fish pillow that Nanakko always carries. Billy also appears as other forms of merchandise, such as the keychain Nana gives Yuichi for Christmas. During Christmas, Nana even dressed up as Billy to avoid being recognized by classmates, her counselor, and the vice principal because it was against school policy for students to take on part-time jobs when they should be studying for entrance exams.
DJ 623 (Mutsumi Hojo) - The host of the Examinee #623 radio show. He gives advice on various topics, including good luck charms and studying tips. When Nana and Hitomi run into him on the train to school, he was pleased to meet two of his fans. He asks people to send faxes during his radio show any time they want someone to know something. He is upbeat and quite friendly, with noticeably bright blue hair, and even has the nerve to rub Mr. Handa's head and remark it is like a mushroom (a melon in the dubbed version). DJ 623 is also a character in the anime Sgt. Frog named as "Saburo Mutsumi".

Episodes

Music
Opening Theme
"Success, Success" by nanaxnana (Nana Mizuki, Sumomo Momomori, Mai Asagi, Yukari Fukui)
Ending Theme
"Birdie, Birdie" by Nana Mizuki

In other media
Sgt. Frog
Sgt. Frogs manga artist, Mine Yoshizaki, created the character concept designs for Seven of Seven. As such, various crossovers exist between the series. The character of Mutsumi Hojo, who appears as "Examinee 623" and the host of his own radio program in Seven of Seven, is a major character in Sgt. Frog. Melody Honey, a minor character in Sgt. Frog, appears and even receives a backstory. Additionally, the recurring ghost character in Sgt. Frog very closely resembles the design of the ghost that appeared in the temple in episode 12 of Seven of Seven.

In addition, episode 89 of Sgt. Frog features a plot that splits Corporal Giroro into seven personalities, most of whom resemble Nana's split personalities. A segment of the episode featuring Mutsumi takes place at the cherry tree seen frequently in Seven of Seven. In Volume 18 of the manga, a ninja named Nana is introduced. She looks identical to Nana from Seven of Seven. She also had six copies, each one with a personality matching the various Nanas from Seven of Seven.

References

External links

Official production sites
 GENCO 
 OB Planning 
 Starchild

Reviews
Anime on DVD: Vol.1 • Vol.2 • Vol.3 • Vol.4 • Vol.5 • Vol.6
Otaku Review

2001 manga
2002 anime television series debuts
2002 Japanese television series endings
ADV Manga
Akita Shoten manga
Anime with original screenplays
Anime Works
Comedy anime and manga
School life in anime and manga
Television series about cloning
Shōnen manga
TV Tokyo original programming